Jaan Undusk (born 14 November 1958 in Otepää, Valga County) is an Estonian writer, playwright and literary scholar.

He has been the head of Under and Tuglas Literature Centre of the Estonian Academy of Sciences.

Since 1990, he is a member of Estonian Writers' Union. Since 2007, he is a member of Estonian Academy of Sciences.

Awards
 1986 and 2003 Friedebert Tuglas short story award (1986 and 2003)
 1995 Herder Prize

Works
 short story "Sina, Tuglas" (1987)
 novel "Kuum. Lugu noorest armastusest" (1990)
 play "Good-bye, Vienna" (1999)
 play "Quevedo" (2003)
 play "Boulgakoff" (2005)

References

Living people
1958 births
Estonian male short story writers
Estonian male novelists
Estonian dramatists and playwrights
University of Tartu alumni
People from Otepää